Ruairí Ó Murchú (born 3 May 1978) is an Irish Sinn Féin politician who has been a Teachta Dála (TD) for the Louth constituency since the 2020 general election.

He was a member of Louth County Council representing the Dundalk South local electoral area from 2017 to 2020, replacing Councillor Kevin Meenan. He was re-elected to Louth County Council again in 2019. Kevin Meenan was co-opted to Ó Murchú's seat on Louth County Council following his election to the Dáil.

Personal life 
Ó Murchú grew up in Knockbridge and holds degrees from Dublin City University and Griffith College Dublin. He lives in Bay Estate, Dundalk with his wife Annemarie Ó Murchú. They have two sons and a stepson.

References 

Sinn Féin TDs (post-1923)
1978 births
Living people
People from Dundalk
Alumni of Dublin City University
Members of the 33rd Dáil
Local councillors in County Louth